Hever village  is a village and civil parish in the Sevenoaks District of Kent, England. The parish  is located on the River Eden, a tributary of the River Medway, east of Edenbridge. The parish includes the villages of Four Elms, Hever itself, and Markbeech, and has a population of 1,136, increasing to 1,231 at the 2011 Census.

The place-name 'Hever' may come from 'Heanyfre', meaning 'high edge', which is attested in Saxon charter S175 of 814, referring to an altogether different place.

Hever contains Hever Castle, the childhood home of Anne Boleyn, second wife of King Henry VIII.

There are three parish churches, one at each village. All are one united benefice. In the parish church of St Peter is the tomb of Thomas Boleyn, the father of Anne Boleyn and grandfather of Queen Elizabeth I.

It is on the Oxted line between Uckfield and Oxted, with services often continuing to London Bridge.

References

External links

Hever parish council
The three churches

Villages in Kent
Civil parishes in Kent